Aminata Sacko (born 27 August 1984) is a Malian footballer who plays as a defender. She has been a member of the Mali women's national team.

Club career
Sacko has played for Super Lionnes in Mali.

International career
Sacko capped for Mali at senior level during the 2006 African Women's Championship. She captained the team at the 2016 Africa Women Cup of Nations.

References

1984 births
Living people
Malian women's footballers
Women's association football defenders
Mali women's international footballers
21st-century Malian people